The Runc is a right tributary of the river Jaleș in Romania. It flows into the Jaleș in Câmpofeni.

References

Rivers of Romania
Rivers of Gorj County